Aleki is a given name. Notable people with the name include:

 Aleki Morris-Lome (born 1994), New Zealand rugby union player
 Aleki Lutui (born 1978), Tongan rugby union player

See also
 Alek
 Alexi

Masculine given names